The October Group was a collective of constructivist artists active in the Soviet Union from 1928 to 1932.

The artists involved include:
 Gustav Klutsis
 Alexander Rodchenko
 Sergei Eisenstein
 El Lissitzky
 Aleksei Gan
 Sergei Senkin
 Solomon Telingater
 Leonid Vesnin, Victor Vesnin, and Alexander Vesnin

References

Constructivism (art)
Russian painters
Russian photographers
Russian avant-garde

Soviet painters
Soviet photographers